Allan Francis Shearan (born 1 July 1953) is a former Australian politician, elected as a member of the New South Wales Legislative Assembly.

Shearan represented Londonderry  for the Labor Party from 2003 to 2011.

Notes

 

Members of the New South Wales Legislative Assembly
1953 births
Living people
Australian Labor Party members of the Parliament of New South Wales
21st-century Australian politicians